The 2018 Southeast Asian Girls' U17 Volleyball Championship, referred to as the 2018 Est Cola Southeast Asian Girls' U17 "Princess Cup" Volleyball Championship for sponsorship reasons, will be the twentieth edition of the Princess Cup Volleyball Championship, a biennial international volleyball tournament organised by the Asian Volleyball Confederation (AVC), Southeast Asian Zonal Volleyball Association (SEAZVA) with Thailand Volleyball Association (TVA) for the girls' under-17 national teams of Southeast Asia. The tournament will be held in Nakhon Pathom, Thailand, from 13 to 17 May 2018.

A total of seven teams played in the tournament, with players born on or after 1 January 2001 eligible to participate.

Qualification
The three SEAZVA member associations, also four invited team from the another two AVC affiliated zonal member associations will participate in the tournament with Thailand already qualified as host country, all teams participated in the 2018 Asian Girls' U17 Volleyball Championship, excluded Singapore.

Qualified teams
The following teams qualified for the tournament.

Pools composition

Venue
Nakhon Pathom Gymnasium in Mueang Nakhon Pathom, Nakhon Pathom

Preliminary round

Pool standing procedure
 Number of matches won
 Match points
 Sets ratio
 Points ratio
 Result of the last match between the tied teams

Match won 3–0 or 3–1: 3 match points for the winner, 0 match points for the loser
Match won 3–2: 2 match points for the winner, 1 match point for the loser
Match forfeited: 0 match points for each.

Pool A

|}

Pool B

|}

Final round

Bracket

Fifth place

|}

Semi-finals

|}

Third place

|}

Final

|}

Final standing

Medalists

Awards

Most Valuable Player

Best Outside Spikers

Best Setter

Best Opposite Spiker

Best Middle Blocker

Best Libero

See also
2018 Asian Girls' U17 Volleyball Championship

References

2018
Southeast Asian U17 Championship
International volleyball competitions hosted by Thailand
2018 in Thai sport
May 2018 sports events in Asia